Savalagi  is a village in the southern state of Karnataka, India,  It is located in the Jamkhandi taluk of Bagalkot district in Karnataka, it is the birthplace of B.  D.  Jatti former Vice President of India , also served the Chief Minister of Mysore , Governor of Odisha.

Demographics
 India census, Savalagi had a population of 9623 with 4981 males and 4642 females.

See also
 Bagalkot
 Districts of Karnataka

References

External links
 http://Bagalkot.nic.in/

Villages in Bagalkot district